The 1983–84 Bulgarian Cup was the 44th season of the Bulgarian Cup. Levski Sofia won the competition, beating Botev Plovdiv 1–0 in the final at the Druzhba Stadium in Kardzhali.

First round

|-
!colspan=5 style="background-color:#D0F0C0;" |October 1983

|}

Second round

|}

Third round
In this round include the four teams, who participated in the European tournaments (CSKA, Levski, Spartak Varna and Lokomotiv Plovdiv).

|-
!colspan=5 style="background-color:#D0F0C0;" |20/26 February 1984

|}

Quarter-finals

|}

Semi-finals

Final

Details

References

1983-84
1983–84 domestic association football cups
Cup